Torbjörn Mårtensson (born 17 February 1972) is a Swedish sprinter. He competed in the men's 4 × 100 metres relay at the 1996 Summer Olympics.

References

1972 births
Living people
Athletes (track and field) at the 1996 Summer Olympics
Swedish male sprinters
Olympic athletes of Sweden
Place of birth missing (living people)
20th-century Swedish people